Bridge Inn may refer to:

Bridge Inn, Topsham, Grade II listed public house at Bridge Hill, Topsham, Devon, England
Bridge End Inn, pub in Ruabon, Wales
Trent Bridge Inn, pub in Nottingham, England